Maduve Madi Nodu is a 1965 Indian Kannada-language film,  directed by Hunsur Krishnamurthy and produced by Nagi Reddi and Chakrapani. The film stars Rajkumar, R. Nagendra Rao, Udaykumar and Narasimharaju. The film has musical score by Ghantasala. It is a remake of producer's own Telugu film Pelli Chesi Choodu (1952). The movie was a profitable venture and was declared a super hit.

Cast

Rajkumar as Vasu
R. Nagendra Rao as Venkatapathy, Vasu's father
Udaykumar as Bheemanna
Narasimharaju as Raju
K. S. Ashwath as Parameshwaraiah, a politician
H. R. Shastry as Govinda
Rathnakar
Hanumanthachar
Dwarakish as Simhadri
Satyam
Ganapathi Bhat
Basavaraj (credited as Master Basavaraj) as Gopi
Leelavathi as Saraswati, Raju's sister
Vandana
Jayashree
Ramadevi
Rama

Soundtrack
The music was composed by Ghantasala.

References

External links
 

1965 films
1960s Kannada-language films
Kannada remakes of Telugu films
Films directed by Hunsur Krishnamurthy